Rajnath Sonkar Shastri is an Indian politician.  He was elected to the Lok Sabha, the lower house of the Parliament of India from the Saidpur, Uttar Pradesh as a member of the Janata Dal.

References

External links
Official biographical sketch in Parliament of India website

1939 births
Living people
Lok Sabha members from Uttar Pradesh
India MPs 1991–1996
India MPs 1980–1984
Janata Dal politicians
Janata Party (Secular) politicians
Bharatiya Janata Party politicians from Uttar Pradesh
Bharatiya Jana Sangh politicians
Lok Dal politicians
Uttar Pradesh MLAs 1985–1989